The 1930 Tipperary Senior Hurling Championship was the 40th staging of the Tipperary Senior Hurling Championship since its establishment by the Tipperary County Board in 1887.

Thurles Sarsfields were the defending champions.

Toomevara won the championship after a 4-01 to 1-00 defeat of Boherlahan in the final. It was their eighth championship title overall and their first title since 1923.

References

Tipperary
Tipperary Senior Hurling Championship